Ebina Danjo (海老名 弾正) (September 18, 1856  May 22, 1937) was a Japanese educator and philosopher, as well as a Christian missionary and pastor. He was known for his "Shintoistic Christianity", and served as the president of Doshisha University.

Biography

Early life 
Ebina was born on September 18, 1856, in Yanagawa Domain, Chikugo province (modern-day Fukuoka Prefecture). He was baptized by Leroy Lansing Janes in 1876, after Japan's ban on Christianity was lifted in 1874.

In autumn of 1876, Ebina transferred to Doshisha University, where he studied under Joseph Hardy Neesima. At Neesima's recommendation, in 1877 Ebina spent the summer in Annaka, Kozuke Province working as a missionary. His sermons were well-received, and 50-60 young men would gather to listen to him. Ebina returned in 1878, and invited Neesima to come with him.

Pastor 
Ebina graduated from Doshisha in 1879, and returned to Annaka Church as its pastor. Before he left, Neesima laid his hands on him.

In 1882, Ebina married , Yokoi Shonan's oldest daughter.

He eventually entrusted the church to Tokio Yokoi, and returned to Kumamoto.

Ebina became the president of the Japanese Christian Mission company in 1890. With Miyagawa Tsuneteru and Kozaki Hiromichi, he was called one of the "Three Elders" of the Kumiai Church. In 1893 he became the pastor at the  until he moved to Tokyo in 1897 and resumed his pastorship at Hongo Congregational Church. 

In 1900, Ebina began publishing a magazine called "". Working with Yoshino Sakuzo, and Suzuki Bunji, the magazine gained a lot of attention among Japanese philosophers and Christians.

In 1916, he earned a doctorate in divinity from the Pacific Theological Seminary,Honorary? and in 1924 he received an honorary doctorate in law from Pomona College.

President of Doshisha University 
In 1920, Ebina began working as the eighth president of Doshisha University. While he began his tenure by overhauling the university's financial system, which caused friction with the Board of Directors, who had vested interests in many parts of the university. During this time, Ebina's health worsened until he had to undergo treatment in 1928. On November 23, when he was still in the hospital, a fire broke out in a classroom, causing a riot. Two days later, on November 25, the entire Board resigned, leaving Ebina with sole responsibility over the incident. He returned to Hongo Congregational church and served as its pastor until he died on May 22, 1937.

Selected bibliography

Further reading

References 

1856 births
1937 deaths
Protestant theologians
Presidents of universities and colleges in Japan
Japanese theologians
People from Fukuoka Prefecture